New Fairfield is a town in Fairfield County, Connecticut, United States. The population was 13,579 at the 2020 census. New Fairfield is one of five towns that surround Candlewood Lake, the largest lake in Connecticut.

History
In pre-colonial times, the indigenous people of New Fairfield were part of an alliance of tribes that extended from the source of the Housatonic to the sea.

In 1724, colonial settlers from Fairfield, Connecticut, received approval from the General Assembly of the Colony of Connecticut to establish a new township. According to one account, they negotiated with Chief Squantz of the Schaghticoke tribe of Algonquian lineage. Alternatively, it is told that they did not negotiate with Chief Squantz because he moved to the north end of Squantz Pond land area and refused to "sell" the township of New Fairfield. They returned in the Spring of 1725, but found that Chief Squantz had died during the winter. His four sons and heirs refused to sign the deeds. It was not until four years later that the white men called "The Proprietors" finally got the drawn marks of several other native people who may not have had authority to sell the land. They "purchased" a  tract of land that is now New Fairfield and Sherman, for the equivalent of about 300 dollars, and on April 24, 1729, the deed was recorded on May 9, 1729, and is now deposited in the archives of the state capital in Hartford, Connecticut.

Settlers originally spelled the town as "Newfairfield". It started as a very small farming community, and was not incorporated as a town until 1740. The town of Sherman separated from New Fairfield in 1862, as the size of the combined towns made it difficult to travel to church.

In 1926, Connecticut Light and Power (CL&P) began construction on Candlewood Lake, considered by many to be an engineering wonder. CL&P flooded the valley to control the water flow from the Housatonic and Rocky Rivers and produce hydroelectric power for the region. Candlewood Lake was named for the Native American practice of using stripped wood from pine trees as kindling for fire. The lake shares its shores with the towns of New Fairfield, Sherman, New Milford, Brookfield, and Danbury.

New Fairfield was home to the Candlewood Playhouse, a 650-seat summer stock theater run by the Gateway Playhouse, currently operating in Bellport, New York. The land once occupied by it is now a Stop and Shop supermarket.

Geography

New Fairfield borders Danbury to the south, Brookfield to the southeast, New Milford to the northeast, Sherman to the north, and Patterson, New York to the west.

There are four lakes in New Fairfield: Candlewood Lake, Squantz Pond, Ball Pond, and Margerie Lake Reservoir. Candlewood Lake dominates the eastern side of the town and extends both north and south beyond the town borders. Once a summer resort destination, the lake shore within New Fairfield is now mostly populated with many year-round homes.

Principal communities

 Ball Pond
 Candlewood Hills
 Candlewood Isle
 Candlewood Knolls
 Knollcrest
 New Fairfield center

Other minor named locales in the town are Bigelow Corners, Bogus Hill, Candlewood Corner, Charcoal Ridge, Hollywyle Park, Inglenook, Joyce Hill, Kellogg Point, Locust Glen, Possum Ridge, Sail Harbor, and Taylor Corners.

The newer communities with larger houses can be found in Sail Harbor. Many communities have large houses with direct waterfront access to Candlewood Lake, such as Sail Harbor, Candlewood Isle, and Bogus Hill. There have been many new subdivisions such as communities off Warwick Road, Route 39/37, Pine Hill, Beaver Bog, Dick Finn, and Shortwoods Road.

ZIP code 

When ZIP codes were introduced in 1963, the original Danbury code, 06810, also covered the whole of New Fairfield. When Danbury received additional ZIP codes in 1984, a new code, 06812, was introduced for New Fairfield.

Demographics

As of the census of 2000, there were 13,953 people, 4,638 households, and 3,905 families residing in the town. The racial makeup of the town was 96.83% White, 0.39% African American, 0.04% Native American, 1.27% Asian, 0.01% Pacific Islander, 0.52% from other races, and 0.95% from two or more races. Hispanic or Latino of any race were 2.82% of the population.

The 2000 census reported that New Fairfield was the most heavily Irish-American community in Connecticut, with about 32% of the residents claiming Irish ancestry.

There were 4,638 households, out of which 44.5% had children under the age of 18 living with them, 75.3% were married couples living together, 6.5% had a female householder with no husband present, and 15.8% were non-families. 12.6% of all households were made up of individuals, and 5.0% had someone living alone who was 65 years of age or older.  The average household size was 3.01 and the average family size was 3.30.

In the town, the population was spread out, with 30.0% under the age of 18, 5.1% from 18 to 24, 30.3% from 25 to 44, 25.9% from 45 to 64, and 8.6% who were 65 years of age or older.  The median age was 37 years. For every 100 females, there were 99.6 males.  For every 100 females age 18 and over, there were 96.7 males.

The median income for a household in the town was $106,145, and the median income for a family was $132,271. Males had a median income of $65,978 versus $40,284 for females. The per capita income for the town was $34,928.  About 1.0% of families and 1.7% of the population were below the poverty line, including 1.5% of those under age 18 and 4.7% of those age 65 or over.

Arts and culture

Attractions

 Candlewood Lake
 Cosier-Murphy House – added to the National Register of Historic Places on August 31, 1991
 New Fairfield Historical District
 Pootatuck State Forest
 Squantz Pond State Park is partly in the town.
 Williams House – added to the National Register of Historic Places on May 4, 2014

Government

Historically, New Fairfield has been a Republican-leaning stronghold in Fairfield County. Lyndon B. Johnson is the only Democrat who has managed to win the town in his landslide victory in 1964.

Education

New Fairfield has one high school for grades 9–12, New Fairfield High School. Connected directly to the high school is a middle school for grades 6–8, New Fairfield Middle School. The town has one elementary school for grades 3–5, Meeting House Hill School, as well as a primary school for Kindergarten through grade 2, Consolidated School. There are also two preschool/day care centers, Bright Beginnings and First Step Preschool.

Transportation

Connecticut Route 37 and Connecticut Route 39 are the two primary state roads thar connect New Fairfield. Interstate 84 is the closest highway, located in Danbury to the south.  

New Fairfield does not have its own train station. The closest stations are Southeast station on the Harlem Line, and Danbury Station on the Danbury Branch of the New Haven Line. Housatonic Area Regional Transit (HART) operates a weekday commuter shuttle between Southeast station, and the town's two park and ride lots (located at the Ball Pond Firehouse and the Company A Firehouse).

Notable people

 Margot Austin (1907–1990), author, illustrator
 Rich Bisaccia (born 1960), Las Vegas Raiders Interim Head Coach
 Mary Ann Carson, Connecticut State Representative
 Jake Ceresna (born 1994), professional football player
 Frank Figliuzzi (born 1962), former assistant director of Counter Intelligence at the FBI. Frequent cable news guest
 Ken Jurkowski (born 1981), Olympic rower 2008 & 2012
 Steven Novella (born 1964), neurologist, host of the Skeptics' Guide to the Universe
 Jennifer Rizzotti (born 1974), professional basketball player and coach
 Bernie Williams (born 1968), retired professional baseball player for the New York Yankees

References

External links

 

 
Towns in Fairfield County, Connecticut
Towns in the New York metropolitan area
Towns in Connecticut